Howie Mandel's Sunny Skies is a sketch comedy television series, which aired in 1995. Produced by Atlantis Communications for Showtime in the United States and CBC Television in Canada, the series starred comedian Howie Mandel alongside a supporting cast of comedians including Stephen Furst, Tim Bagley, Deborah Theaker, Jennifer Butt and Rob Cohen.

The series also included short videos created by one of its writers, then-unknown comedian Louis C.K. Guest performers appearing on the series included Robert Smigel, Dave Foley, Gilbert Gottfried, Frankie Avalon and Moon Unit Zappa.

The show aired on Showtime in summer 1995, and was scheduled by CBC Television to premiere in September.

The series was not well-reviewed by critics, or successful in the ratings in either Canada or the United States. Showtime aired all 13 episodes, but in Canada CBC Television cut the series after five episodes and scheduled the remainder for a burn-off run in summer 1996. Neither network renewed the series for a second season.

Mandel garnered a CableACE Award nomination for Best Actor in a Comedy Series at the 17th CableACE Awards.

References

External links

1995 American television series debuts
1995 American television series endings
1995 Canadian television series debuts
1995 Canadian television series endings
CBC Television original programming
Showtime (TV network) original programming
1990s American sketch comedy television series
1990s Canadian sketch comedy television series
Television series by Alliance Atlantis